The following is a list of people from Detroit, Michigan. This list includes notable people who were born, have lived, or worked in and around Detroit as well as its metropolitan area.

Activists 
 Octavia Williams Bates
Gin'nnah Muhammad
 Rosa Parks
 Betty Shabazz
 Jalonne White-Newsome
 Malcolm X

Artists

Architects 
 Charles N. Agree
 C. Howard Crane
Joseph Nathaniel French
 Albert Kahn
 Wirt C. Rowland
 Minoru Yamasaki

Ceramists 
 Horace Caulkins
 Tom Lollar
 Diana Pancioli
 Mary Chase Perry Stratton

Dancers 
 Lottie "The Body" Graves

Fashion designers 
 Tracy Reese
 Anna Sui
 John Varvatos

Painters 
 Larry D. Alexander
 Ian Hornak
 Charles McGee
 Allie McGhee
 Gari Melchers
 Eric Millikin
 Niagara
 Carl Owens
 John Mix Stanley
 Carol Wald

Photographers 
 Bill Schwab
 Irakly Shanidze
 Taro Yamasaki

Sculptors 
 Marshall Fredericks
 Mike Kelley
 Julius T. Melchers
 Carl Milles
 Corrado Parducci
 Richard Ritter
 Carlo Romanelli
 Edward Wagner

Textile designers 
 Ruth Adler Schnee

Astronauts 
 Gregory Jarvis

Business, industry, academics, and labor 

 Steve Ballmer
 Elissa P. Benedek
 William E. Boeing
 George Gough Booth
 Eli Broad
 Roy D. Chapin
 Roy D. Chapin Jr.
 Nina Clifford
 Louis-Césaire Dagneau Douville de Quindre
 Bertrand Curtis Spitzley
 William Davidson
 John DeLorean
 Horace Elgin Dodge
 John Francis Dodge
 Shel Dorf
 George Doundoulakis
 William C. Durant
 Jeremiah Dwyer
 William R. Farrand
 Mark Fields
 Charles T. Fisher
 Alfred Ford
 Edsel Ford
 Edsel Ford II
 Henry Ford
 Henry Ford II
 William Clay Ford Jr.
 William Clay Ford Sr.
 Charles Lang Freer
 Dan Gilbert
 Elizabeth L. Gleicher
 Les Gold
 Berry Gordy
 Edgar Gott
 Tyree Guyton
Arthur Hayes
 Frank J. Hecker
 Jimmy Hoffa
 Joseph L. Hudson
 Christopher Ilitch
 Denise Ilitch
 Marian Ilitch
 Mike Ilitch
 Peter Karmanos Jr.
 William J. Keep
 Sebastian S. Kresge
 Henry M. Leland
 Charles Lindbergh
 Michael J. Malik Sr.
 Alex Manoogian
 Oscar F. Mayer
 Elijah McCoy
 Manuel "Matty" Moroun
 Alan Mulally
 David Overton
 Francis Palms
 Roger Penske
 Heinz Prechter
 Ashley Qualls
 Walter Reuther
 Stephen M. Ross
 Jeffrey Sachs
 James E. Scripps
 Robert J. Shiller (born 1946)
 Art Van Elslander
 James Vernor
 Hiram Walker
 B. Joseph White
 Kate Williams
 Ralph Wilson
 Mark Zbikowski

Clergy and religion 
 Solanus Casey
 Gregory Dickow
 C. L. Franklin
 Lucien Greaves
 Wallace Fard Muhammad
 Jack Van Impe

Government and politics 

 Albert M. Bielawski
 James Blanchard
 Sonny Bono
 Walter B. Brady
 Cora Brown
 Henry Billings Brown
 Vern Buchanan
 Ella Bully-Cummings
 Ralph Bunche
 Mickey Cafagna
 Walter H. Campbell
 Ben Carson
 Lewis Cass
 Roy D. Chapin
 J. Michelle Childs
 John Conyers
 Francis X. Desnoyers
 Thomas E. Dewey
 Emma Didlake
 John Dingell
 John Dingell Sr.
 Gershwin A. Drain
 Keith Ellison
 Jack Faxon
 William Webb Ferguson
 Moses W. Field
 Burley Follett
 Michael Fougere
 Nathan Goodell
 Reneé Hall
 Albert Hammond
 Tom Hayden
 Robert J. Huber
 Tupac A. Hunter
 Jon A. Husted
 Marilyn Jean Kelly
 Kwame Kilpatrick
 T. John Lesinski
 Carl Levin
 Viola Liuzzo
 Henry W. Lord
 Alfred Lucking
 John N. Mitchell
 Frank Murphy
 Simon J. Murphy Jr.
 John Stoughton Newberry
 Casmer P. Ogonowski
 Dorothy Comstock Riley
 Mitt Romney
 Joseph P. Sanger
 Henry Hastings Sibley
 Augustus B. Woodward
 Coleman Young

Movie, radio, television figures and journalists 

 Nicole Alexander
 Byron Allen
 Tim Allen
 Maureen Anderman
 Curtis Armstrong
 Lucille Ball
 Joan Barry
 Josh Becker
 Kristen Bell
 Mary L. Bell
 Jim Bellows
 Elizabeth Berkley
 Mike Binder
 Selma Blair
 Bill Bonds
 Jerry Bruckheimer
 Ellen Burstyn
 Dean Cain
 Bruce Campbell
 Bill Carruthers
 Kim Carson
 Seymour Cassel
 Jessica Cauffiel
 Carol Christensen
 Art Clokey
 Francis Ford Coppola
 Roger Corman
 Dave Coulier
 Wally Cox
 Nicole Curtis
 Vondie Curtis-Hall
 Pam Dawber
 Jude Demorest
 Ryan Destiny
 Doris Dowling
 Wayne Dyer
 Dana Elcar
 Sherilyn Fenn
 Audrey Ferris
 Jeremy David Fisher
 Dann Florek
 Fred Foy
 Max Gail
 Sara Ganim
 Cyndy Garvey
 Marla Gibbs
 Robin Givhan
 Reagan Gomez-Preston
 Chuck Goudie
 Gael Greene
 Judy Greer
 David Alan Grier
 Karl Haas
 Norman Hackett
 Kirsten Haglund
 Chris Hansen
 Elisabeth Harnois
 Julie Harris
 Butch Hartman
 Charlie Hill
 Jemele Hill
 Ellen Hollman
 Telma Hopkins
 Royce Howes
 Ernie Hudson
 Hughes brothers (Albert and Allen Hughes)
 John Hughes
 Tom Hulce
 Kim Hunter
 Darren James
 Al Jean
 Ken Jeong
 Gus Johnson
 Walter Emanuel Jones
 Ella Joyce
 Casey Kasem
 Andrew Keenan-Bolger
 Celia Keenan-Bolger
 Maggie Keenan-Bolger
 Brian Kelly
 David Patrick Kelly
 Carrie Keranen
 Keegan-Michael Key
 Richard Kiel
 Michael Kinsley
 Jana Kramer
 Neil LaBute
 Ray Lane
 Piper Laurie
 Joan Leslie
 Lashonda Lester
 James Lipton
 Brandi Love
 Loni Love
 Robert Mac
 Lee Majors
 Dick Martin
 Greg Mathis
 Karen McDougal
 Antoine McKay
 Ed McMahon
 Tim Meadows
 S. Epatha Merkerson
 Nicki Micheaux
 Ivana Miličević
 Martin Milner
 David Robert Mitchell
 Kenya Moore
 Naima Mora
 Harry Morgan
 Michael Moriarty
 Bob Murawski
Tariq Nasheed
 Vincenzo Natali
 Denise Nicholas
 George Noory
 Rob Paulsen
 George Peppard
 Gilda Radner
 Sam Raimi
 Ted Raimi
 Joyce Randolph
 Amber Rayne
 Della Reese
 Gene Reynolds
 Sam Richardson
 Tim Robinson
 Fred Roggin
 Bruce Joel Rubin
 Michelle Ruff
 Roz Ryan
 Pat St. John
 Soupy Sales
 Chris Savino
 George C. Scott
 Tom Selleck
 Dax Shepard
 Serena Shim
 Sicily
 Stirling Silliphant
 J. K. Simmons
 Tom Sizemore
 Tom Skerritt
 Nick Sousanis
 David Spade
 Elaine Stritch
 Geoff Stults
 George Stults
 William Talman
 Danny Thomas
 Marlo Thomas
 Lily Tomlin
 Courtney B. Vance
 Jordan Vogt-Roberts
 Robert Wagner
 Cynthia Watros
 Peter Werbe
 Billy West
 Rachelle Wilkos
 Robin Williams
 John Witherspoon
 Max Wright
 H.M. Wynant
 Lucky Yates
 Steven Yeun

Musicians, bands and composers 

 42 Dugg
 Aaliyah
 Geri Allen
 Almighty Dreadnaughtz
 The Amboy Dukes
 Anybody Killa
 Dorothy Ashby
 Juan Atkins
 Bad Meets Evil
 Anita Baker
 Florence Ballard
 Hank Ballard
 Ortheia Barnes
 Brendan Benson
 Big Herk
 Big Sean
 Bizarre
 The Black Dahlia Murder
 Blade Icewood
 Blaze Ya Dead Homie
 Bliss 66
 Blue Stahli
 Brainstorm
 Broadzilla
 Roy Brooks
 Danny Brown
 Kenny Burrell
 Donald Byrd
 Robert Byrne
 Carl Carlton
 Ron Carter
 Celldweller
 Cha Cha
 Champtown
 Cherrelle
 The Clark Sisters
 George Clinton
 Anita Cochran
 Alice Coltrane
 The Contours
 Alice Cooper
 Marshall Crenshaw
 D12
 Dark Lotus
 DeBarge
 Warren Defever
 Dej Loaf
 Ken Delo
 Johnny Desmond
 Destroy All Monsters
 The Detroit Cobras
 Marcella Detroit
 David DiChiera
 The Dirtbombs
 Vinnie Dombroski
 Lamont Dozier
 The Dramatics
 Dwele
 Dennis Edwards
 Jango Edwards
 Electric Six
 Eminem
 Enchantment
 Esham
 Maria Ewing
 Factory 81
 Abdul Fakir
 Henry Fambrough
 Fatt Father
 Shamari Fears
 Tommy Flanagan
 The Floaters
 Sean Forbes
 The Four Tops
 Aretha Franklin
 Erma Franklin
 Paul Franklin
 Glenn Frey
 Curtis Fuller
 The Funk Brothers
 Gallery
 Kenny Garrett
 Marvin Gaye
 Nicci Gilbert
 The Go
 King Gordy
 Gore Gore Girls
 The Gories
 Josh Gracin
 Troy Gregory
 Tee Grizzley
 Jeff Gutt
 Fred Hammond
 Roland Hanna
 The Hard Lessons
 Barry Harris
 Louis Hayes
 Joe Henderson
 Michael Henderson
 Dallas Hodge
 Brian Holland
 Edward Holland Jr.
 Major Holley
 House of Krazees
 Hush
 I See Stars
 Insane Clown Posse
 J Dilla
 Milt Jackson
 Oliver Jackson
 Herb Jeffries
 JMSN
 Little Willie John
 Marv Johnson
 The Jones Girls
 JR JR
 Jumpsteady
 Ray Kamalay
 Kash Doll
 Kem
 Kid Rock
 Kina
Nahru Lampkin
 Bettye LaVette
 Yusef Lateef
 Hugh Lawson
 Laura Lee
 Legz Diamond
 Lizzo
 Joseph LoDuca
 Lene Lovich
 Madonna
 Teairra Marí
 Martha and the Vandellas
 The Marvelettes
 Derrick May
 MC5
 Thema "Tayma Loren" McKinney
 Tomo Miličević
 Jeff Mills
 The Miracles
 Guy Mitchell
 Jack Montrose
 Moodymann
 Motown Rage
 Alicia Myers
 Negative Approach
 Ted Nugent
 Norman O'Connor
 One Way
 The Originals
 Ray Parker Jr.
 Parliament-Funkadelic
 Theo Parrish
 Daniel Passino
 Freda Payne
 Scherrie Payne
 Lawrence Payton
 Peekaboo
 Dave Pike
 Terry Pollard
 Iggy Pop
 Porcelain Black
 Mike Posner
 Proof
 Psychopathic Rydas
 Mike Quatro
 Suzi Quatro
 The Raconteurs
 Rare Earth
 Martha Reeves
 Karriem Riggins
 Robert Bradley's Blackwater Surprise
 Smokey Robinson
 Rockwell
 Sixto Rodriguez
 The Romantics
 Rosetta Pebble
 Frank Rosolino
 Diana Ross
 Royce Da 5'9"
 Rucka Rucka Ali
 Mitch Ryder
 Kevin Saunderson
 Search the City
 Bob Seger
 Slum Village
 Chad Smith
 Brian Southall
 J. D. Souther
 The Spinners
 Sponge
 Edwin Starr
 Sufjan Stevens
 Jason Stollsteimer
 Levi Stubbs
 The Suicide Machines
 The Supremes
 Tally Hall
 The Temptations
 Mark Tremonti
 Obie Trice
 Trick-Trick
 Twiztid
 Uncle Kracker
 The Von Bondies
 Leon Ware
 Don Was
 Dinah Washington
 Keith Washington
 We Came as Romans
 Mary Wells
 Kim Weston
 Jack White
 The White Stripes
 Margaret Whiting
 Brandi Williams
 Jackie Wilson
 Joyce Vincent Wilson
 Mary Wilson
 The Winans family
 Marv Won
 Stevie Wonder
 Belita Woods
 Ali-Ollie Woodson
 Xzibit
 Val Young

Sports figures

American football 
 Anthony Adams
 Erik Affholter
 Fred Arbanas
 Alan Ball
 Willie Beavers
 Kevin Belcher
 Walter Bender
 Jerome Bettis
 Earl Blaik
 Kevin Brooks
 Gilbert Brown
 Rick Byas
 Walt Clago
 Dan Currie
 Gary Danielson
 Joe DeLamielleure
 Bob Dozier
 Braylon Edwards
 Stan Edwards
 Bump Elliott
 Tony F. Elliott
 Phil Emery
 Larry Fitzpatrick
 Willie "The Wisp" Fleming
 Larry Foote
 Ed Frutig
 Devin Funchess
 Devin Gardner
 Sauce Gardner
 Antonio Gates
 Vernon Gholston
 William Gholston
 Jerry Glanville
 Kevin Glenn
 Brandon Graham
 Bobby Grier
 Ruffin Hamilton
 K. J. Hamler
 Aaron Hayden
 Matt Hernandez
 Derek Hill
 Lano Hill
 Lavert Hill
 Pepper Johnson
 Matthew Judon
 Desmond King
 Jason Lamar
 T. J. Lang
 Jourdan Lewis
 Tony Lippett
 Mike Martin
 Greg Marx
 Derrick Mason
 Norm Masters
 Malik McDowell
 Ray McLean
 Lou Mihajlovich
 Harry Newman
 Michael Ojemudia
 Donovan Peoples-Jones
 Nick Perry
 Ron Pitts
 Ron Rice
 Allen Robinson
 Paul Rudzinski
 Robert Saleh
 Bart Scott
 Paul Seymour
 Dion Sims
 Dwight Smith
 Ambry Thomas
 Milt Trost
 Chance Warmack
 Mike Weber
 Norm Wells
 Michael Westbrook

Baseball 
 Ryan Anderson
 Anthony Bass
 Augie Bergamo
 Arlene Buszka
 Danny Fife
 Bill Freehan
 Paul Fry
 Chris Getz
 Kirk Gibson
 Eric Haase
 Harry Heilmann
 Pat Hentgen
 Willie Horton
 Art Houtteman
 Al Kaline
 Dolores Klosowski
 Ryan LaMarre
 Charley Lau
 Ron LeFlore
 DJ LeMahieu
 Stan Lopata
 Derek Lowe
 John Mayberry
 Bob Miller
Anthony Misiewicz
 Mary Ann Moore
 Hal Newhouser
 Milt Pappas
 Billy Pierce
 Nick Plummer
 J. J. Putz
 Ed Reulbach
 Mary Rini
 Chris Sabo
 John Schreiber
 Matt Shoemaker
 Ted Simmons
 John Smoltz
 Frank Tanana
 Jason Varitek
 Margaret Wenzell
 Connie Wisniewski
 Tom Yawkey

Basketball 
 Maurice Ager
 Bacari Alexander
 Keith Appling
 B. J. Armstrong
 Jamie Arnold
 Sam Balter
 Shane Battier
 Dave Bing
 Mark Brisker
 P. J. Brown
 Bill Buntin
Kris Clyburn
 Will Clyburn
 Derrick Coleman
 Jordan Crawford
 Earl Cureton
 Mel Daniels
 Dave DeBusschere
 Chris Douglas-Roberts
 Terry Duerod
 Howard Eisley
 Kay Felder
 Dane Fife
 Marcus Fizer
 Derrick Gervin
 George Gervin
 Willie Green
 Malik Hairston
 Reggie Harding
 Jaden Hardy
 Manny Harris
 Spencer Haywood
 Jermaine Jackson
 Josh Jackson
 Greg Kelser
 Voshon Lenard
 Grant Long
 John Long
 Kalin Lucas
 Tim McCormick
 Terry Mills
 Eric Money
 Jordan Morgan
 Rob Murphy
 Derrick Nix
 Scott Perry
 Rashad Phillips
 Tajuan Porter
 Aerial Powers
 Shawn Respert
 Jalen Reynolds
 Jalen Rose
 Chase Simon
 Steve Smith
 Durrell Summers
 Edmond Sumner
 Roy Tarpley
 Maurice Taylor
 Rudy Tomjanovich
 Robert Traylor
 Terry Tyler
 Derrick Walton
 Gary Waters
 Terrence Watson
 Rocket Watts
 Chris Webber
 Romeo Weems
 Kevin Willis
 Cassius Winston

Bodybuilding 
 Lenda Murray

Boxing 
 Johnathon Banks
 Eddie Futch
 Mickey Goodwin
 Thomas Hearns
 Jackie Kallen
 Hilmer Kenty
 Joe Louis
 Milton McCrory
 Steve McCrory
 Jimmy Paul
 Sugar Ray Robinson
 Mary Jo Sanders
 Emanuel Steward

Fencing 
 Byron Krieger

Frisbee 
 Ken Westerfield

Golf 
 Donna Caponi
 Calvin Peete

Hockey 
 Sid Abel
 Jeff Blashill
 David Booth
 Adam Burt
 Jimmy Carson
 Shawn Chambers
 Kyle Connor
 Alex DeBrincat
 Danny DeKeyser
 Alex Delvecchio
 Cam Fowler
 Nathan Gerbe
 Tim Gleason
 Andy Greene
 Mike Grier
 Mike Hartman
 Derian Hatcher
 Kevin Hatcher
 Connor Hellebuyck
 Gordie Howe
 Mark Howe
 Marty Howe
 Al Iafrate
 Max Jones
 Megan Keller
 Ryan Kesler
 Vladimir Konstantinov
 Torey Krug
 Pat LaFontaine
 Dylan Larkin
 David Legwand
 Nicklas Lidström
 Ted Lindsay
 Cooper Marody
 Alec Martinez
 Mike Modano
 David Moss
 Josh Norris
 Chris Osgood
 Pat Peake
 Jeff Petry
 Kevin Porter
 Brian Rafalski
 Erik Reitz
 Gordie Roberts
 Bryan Rust
 Gordon Tottle
 John Vanbiesbrouck
 Don Waddell
 Doug Weight
 Zach Werenski
 James Wisniewski
 Mike York
 Steve Yzerman

Mixed martial arts 
 Daron Cruickshank
 Kevin Lee

Motorsports 
 Bob Keselowski
 Brad Keselowski
 Brian Keselowski
 Ron Keselowski
 Gordon Mineo
 Benny Parsons
 Phil Parsons

Olympians 
 Pat Costello
 Jim Gardiner
 James McIntosh
 Art McKinlay
 John McKinlay
 John Welchli

Professional wrestling 
 Luther Biggs
 Eric Bischoff
 Bruiser Brody
 Terry "Sabu" Brunk
 D-Ray 3000
 Danhausen
 Excalibur
 Terry "Rhino" Gerin
 Allysin Kay
 Mighty Igor
 Kevin Nash
 Brandi Rhodes
 Bert Ruby
 Chris Sabin
 The Sheik
 Alex Shelley
 Sgt. Slaughter
 George Steele
 Rick Steiner
 Scott Steiner
 Robert Teet

Soccer 
 Cobi Jones
 Alexi Lalas
 Kate Markgraf

Swimming and diving 
 Barbara Gilders
 Fletcher Gilders

Tennis 
 Michael Russell

Track and field 
 Avery Brundage
 Henry Carr
 Marshall Dill
 Ken Doherty
 Guy Murray
 Allen Tolmich
 Delisa Walton-Floyd
 Quincy Watts
 Lorenzo Wright

Writers, novelists and poets 

 Mitch Albom
 Nelson Algren
 Ron Allen
 Harriette Arnow
 Mathis Bailey
 Alice Elinor Bartlett
 Jack Berry
 E. Jean Carroll
 Jeremiah Curtin
 Christopher Paul Curtis
 Jeffrey Eugenides
 Donald Goines
 Edgar Guest
 Judith Guest
 Carla Harryman
 Robert Hayden
 Royce Howes
 Alice Emma Ives
 Geoff Johns
 William Kienzle
 Tim LaHaye
 Helen Landgarten
 Elmore Leonard
 Philip Levine
 Thomas Ligotti
 Thomas Lynch
 Robert Lyons
 Dwayne McDuffie
 Ron Milner
 James O'Barr
 Joyce Carol Oates
 Daniel Okrent
 Marge Piercy
 Alice Randall
 Dudley Randall
 John Sinclair
 Jim Starlin
 Paul Vachon
 Barrett Watten
 Michael Zadoorian
 Helen Zia

See also 

 List of people from Michigan

Notes

References and further reading 
 
 
 
 
 
 
 

Detroit
Culture of Detroit
Michigan culture
Detroit
People